Bausback is a German surname. Notable people with the surname include:

 Emily Bausback (2002), Canadian retired figure skater
 Kurt Bausback (1960), American rower
 Winfried Bausback (1965), German politician

German-language surnames
Surnames from nicknames